Overclass is a recent and pejorative term for the most powerful group in a social hierarchy. Users of the term generally imply excessive and unjust privilege and exploitation of the rest of society.

The word is fairly recent: the Oxford English Dictionary included it only in December 2004. But it has been in use since at least 1995. Some writers compare it to the more familiar underclass:

The influence of the actions by the overclass have been rigorously studied, particularly with regards to notions of intersections between the overclass and specific races.  Most notable of these racial overclasses is the NEWBO, or NEW Black Overclass in America.

Perhaps the most commonly agreed-upon "overclass" consists of leaders in international business, finance and the arms trade.

See also 

 Lists of billionaires
 Oligarchy
 Power elite
 Ruling class
 Transnational capitalist class (also see Superclass)
 Upper class
 Underclass

References

Further reading
  Newsweek cover story on "How the new elite scrambled up the merit ladder—and wants to stay there any way it can."

External links
 Why the Right Is Wrong for America, 1996
 To have and to have not, 1995

1995 neologisms
Social groups
Power (social and political) concepts
Political slurs